Space Quest IV: Roger Wilco and the Time Rippers is a 1991 graphic adventure game by Sierra On-Line. It was released on floppy disks on March 4, 1991, and released on CD-ROM in December 1992 with full speech support and featuring Laugh-In announcer Gary Owens as the voice of the narrator. It featured 256-color hand painted graphics and a fully mouse-driven interface. It was one of the first video games to use motion capture animation. It cost over US$1,000,000 to produce and sold more than its three predecessors combined. An Atari ST version was announced via Sierra Online's magazine, Sierra News Magazine, but was later canceled.

Plot 
In this installment, Roger embarks on a time-travel adventure through Space Quest games both past and future. A reborn Sludge Vohaul from Space Quest XII: Vohaul's Revenge II chases Roger through time in an attempt to finally kill him. Roger also visits Space Quest X: Latex Babes of Estros (whose title is a parody of Infocom's game Leather Goddesses of Phobos) and Space Quest I; in the latter, the graphics and music revert to the style of the original game and Roger is threatened by a group of monochromatic bikers who consider Roger's 256 colors pretentious. None of the gameplay takes place in Space Quest IV. In fact, the "actual" Space Quest IV is only seen briefly in the introduction.

Gameplay 
In contrast to the first three games, Space Quest IV uses a point-and-click interface, featuring icons for different actions. The icons are an eye, a talking head, a walking person, a hand, a mouth, and a nose, representing look, talk, walk to, use, taste, and smell, respectively. The last two almost never do anything other than provoke a humorous response from the game.

Ms. Astro Chicken 
Ms. Astro Chicken: Flight of the Pullet is a video game embedded within the Latex Babes of Estros portion of the game, in a mall arcade. It is a sequel of sorts to Astro Chicken, an arcade game that appeared in Space Quest III. The game's name is a parody of the actual arcade game Ms. Pac-Man. The Astro Chicken theme music is a variation on the Chicken Reel, a traditional folk song best known for its use in animated cartoons.

In the game, the player controls a flying chicken, whose enemies include flying squirrels, windpumps, shotgun-wielding hunters and hunting dogs. Dropping eggs on enemies immobilizes them and increases the player's score. After playing the game for a while, the arcade cabinet explodes, though this has no effect on the player or broader game.

Copy protection 
Originally, the time pod codes could only be found in the manual as a form of copy protection. In later releases, the codes were added to the game.

Version differences 

The CD-ROM version has inferior graphics compared to the 256-color floppy version. The graphics had to be altered because of the included Windows-version. Windows 3.x reserved 20 colors for the system thus limiting the application color palette size to 236. A fan-made patch is available to combine floppy version graphics to CD-ROM version

Reception 
According to Sierra On-Line, combined sales of the Space Quest series surpassed 1.2 million units by the end of March 1996.

In 1991, Dragon gave the game 5 out of 5 stars. In 1992, they gave the Macintosh version of the game 5 out of 5 stars as well. Computer Gaming Worlds Charles Ardai stated in 1993 that "the CD-ROM version is even more filling than the original. It accentuates and improves all of the game's strong points", with Owens and others providing much better voice acting than in King's Quest V. While noting that the CD-ROM did not change the brevity of the gameplay, Ardai added that "there are better adventure games than Space Quest IV [but] there are few games that are more entertaining. Fewer still are improved so much in the transition to CD-ROM". He concluded that "Space Quest IV is the perfect multimedia game: it looks and sounds great and it offers an experience one could not get from a floppy-based game". In April 1994 the magazine said that the CD version's voices "bring Roger Wilco's campy world to life ... one of his finest and funniest adventures".

The Amiga release was not as well received as the original PC one, with a number of reviewers citing the poor quality of the conversion, and some Amiga magazines grading the game with a score as low as 19%.

In 1996, Computer Gaming World named Space Quest IV as the funniest game ever made. The editors wrote that it "transformed every sci-fi time-travel cliche with Gary Owens' voice ... providing the perfect comedic counterpoint."

In 2011, Adventure Gamers named Space Quest IV the 48th-best adventure game ever released.

References

External links 
 

1991 video games
Adventure games
Amiga games
Cancelled Atari ST games
DOS games
NEC PC-9801 games
Point-and-click adventure games
ScummVM-supported games
Sierra Entertainment games
Space Quest
Games commercially released with DOSBox
Video games developed in the United States
Video games about time travel
Metafictional video games